American country music duo Brothers Osborne has received nine awards and 23 award nominations in their career. Their first accolade was given from the Academy of Country Music in 2016 for New Artist of the Year. In similar vein, the Country Music Association awarded the duo for a similar trophy later that year. Both associations have also awarded Brothers Osborne their Vocal Duo of the Year accolades. They have also received nominations for their 2018 collaboration with Dierks Bentley. They have received nine nominations from the Grammy Awards, including one win for Best Country Duo/Group Performance at the 2022 Grammy Awards.

Academy of Country Music

!
|-
|2014
|rowspan=2|Vocal Duo of the Year
|rowspan=6|Brothers Osborne
|
|
|-
|rowspan=2|2015
|
|
|-
|rowspan=2|New Vocal Duo of the Year
|
|
|-
|rowspan=2|2016
|
|
|-
|rowspan=2|Vocal Duo of the Year
|
|
|-
|rowspan=2|2017
|
|
|-
|rowspan=3|Video of the Year
|"It Ain't My Fault"
|
|
|-
|rowspan=4|2018
|"Shoot Me Straight"
|
|
|-
|rowspan=2| "Burning Man" (with Dierks Bentley)
|
|
|-
|Musical Event of the Year
|
|
|-
|rowspan=4|Vocal Duo of the Year
|rowspan=4|Brothers Osborne
|
|
|-
|2019
|
|
|-
|2020 
|
|
|-
|rowspan=2|2021
|
|
|-
|Album of the Year
|Skeletons
|
|
|-
|-
|2022
|Vocal Duo of the Year
|Brothers Osborne
|
|
|}

Country Music Association

!
|-
|2015
|Vocal Duo of the Year
|rowspan=2|Brothers Osborne
|
|rowspan=15|
|-
|rowspan=2| 2016
|New Artist of the Year
|
|-
|rowspan=2|Vocal Duo of the Year
|rowspan=2|Brothers Osborne
|
|-
|rowspan=2| 2017
|
|-
|Video of the Year
|"It Ain't My Fault"
|
|-
|rowspan=2|2018
|Vocal Duo of the Year
|Brothers Osborne
|
|-
|Musical Event of the Year
|rowspan=3|"Burning Man" (with Dierks Bentley)
|
|-
|rowspan=4|2019
|Video of the Year
|
|-
|Single of the Year
|
|-
|Musical Event of the Year
|"All My Favorite People" (with Maren Morris)
|
|-
|rowspan=3| Vocal Duo of the Year
|rowspan=3|Brothers Osborne
|
|-
|2020
|
|-
|rowspan=3|2021
|
|-
|Album of the Year
|Skeletons
|
|-
|Video of the Year
|"Younger Me"
|
|-
| 2022
| International Artist Achievement Award
| Brothers Osborne
| 
|
|}

Grammy Awards

!
|-
|2015
|rowspan=4|Best Country Duo/Group Performance
|"Stay a Little Longer"
|
|rowspan=9| 
|-
|2016
|"21 Summer"
|
|-
|2017
|"It Ain't My Fault"
|
|-
|rowspan=2|2018
|"Shoot Me Straight"
|
|-
|Best Country Album
|Port Saint Joe
|
|-
|2019
|rowspan=3|Best Country Duo/Group Performance
|"I Don't Remember Me (Before You)"
|
|-
|2020
|"All Night"
|
|-
|rowspan=2| 2022
|"Younger Me"
|
|-
|Best Country Album
|Skeletons
|
|}

CMT Music Awards

!
|-
|2017
|rowspan=2| Duo Video of the Year
|"21 Summer"
|
|
|-
|rowspan=2|2019
|"I Don't Remember Me (Before You)"
|
|rowspan=2|
|-
|Collaborative Video of the Year
|"Burning Man" (with Dierks Bentley)
|
|-
|}

References

Lists of awards received by American musician
Lists of awards received by musical group